Alan Will Wyatt CBE (born 7 January 1942) was formerly managing director of BBC Television (1991–96) and Chief Executive of BBC Broadcast (1996–99). He was later a company director, media consultant and author.

Early life and career 
Wyatt was born in Oxford and educated at SS. Philip and James primary school and Magdalen College School, Oxford, before winning a scholarship to Emmanuel College, Cambridge. He began work as a trainee journalist on the Sheffield Telegraph and joined BBC Radio News as a sub-editor in 1965 before moving to BBC Television, working for the Presentation Department as producer of Points of View, The Fifties and Storyteller, before joining the daily arts and media programme Late Night Line-Up.

Career at the BBC 
Wyatt originated and edited Edition, presented by Kenneth Allsop, The Book Programme with Robert Robinson and Don't Quote Me.  He produced a number of documentaries including All the Buildings Fit to Print about Nikolaus Pevsner and was executive producer of They've Shot Kennedy, Good Night and Good Luck and The Scars of Autumn. He produced B. Traven: A Mystery Solved and wrote a real-life literary detective story The Man Who Was B. Traven (Cape, 1980). In the USA this was published as The Secret of the Sierra Madre (Doubleday).

By 1978 he was Assistant Head of the Presentation Department, whose output included The Old Grey Whistle Test, The Hollywood Greats and Barry Norman's Film... programme. From 1981 to 1988 he was Head of Documentary Features, starting 40 Minutes, Crimewatch, Food and Drink, Comrades, All Our Working Lives, The Duty Men, Queens' – A Cambridge College, and Michael Palin: Around the World in 80 Days, and negotiating and executive producing the documentary Elizabeth R: A Year in the Life of the Queen, produced by Edward Mirzoeff, the highest rating documentary ever shown by the BBC.

In 1991 he became managing director of BBC Network Television, after a spell as Assistant managing director. As MD he led a revival in drama – Middlemarch, Pride and Prejudice, Between the Lines, The Buddha of Suburbia, Our Friends in the North, Ballykissangel, This Life, Hamish Macbeth and Dalziel and Pascoe – and a strong programme performance in other genres – in comedy, Goodnight Sweetheart, The Wrong Trousers, Absolutely Fabulous, Men Behaving Badly, Knowing Me Knowing You with Alan Partridge, The Fast Show and The Vicar of Dibley; and in documentary series People's Century, The Death of Yugoslavia and The Nazis: A Warning from History. After five years he was made Chief Executive of BBC Broadcast, responsible for all BBC radio networks and television channels in the UK. During this time he oversaw the launch of BBC Online, the BBC's digital television channels and the creation of the BBC's partnership in UKTV and BBC America. He was also deputy to the Director-General John Birt.

Post-BBC career 
Wyatt retired from the BBC at the end of 1999, becoming chairman of the London Institute, comprising Central Saint Martins College of Arts and Design, Camberwell College of Art, Chelsea College of Arts, London College of Fashion and London College of Printing (now Communication), leading it to become the University of the Arts London. He was appointed a CBE in 2000 and was President of the Royal Television Society from 2000 to 2004. From 2002–7 he was Chairman of Human Capital Limited, a media strategy and research consultancy. His second book, The Fun Factory – A Life in the BBC,  was published by Aurum Press in 2003. The documentary film Toni and Rosi, which he produced and directed with Todd Murray, was transmitted on BBC4 in January 2012.

In 2007 he produced the Wyatt Report, an investigation into clips from Monarchy: The Royal Family at Work being shown to journalists which apparently showed the Queen storming out of a session with American photographer Annie Leibovitz. The BBC subsequently admitted that the scenes used in the trailer had been edited out of sequence, leading to the resignation of RDF's Chief Creative Officer Stephen Lambert, BBC One Controller Peter Fincham and Fincham's Head of Publicity, Jane Fletcher, following the report's publication on 5 October.

Other activities 
Wyatt was a director of Coral Eurobet from 2001–3 and also served on the British Horseracing Board's commission into the conditions of stable and stud staff. He was on the board of Racecourse Media Group from its start in 2004 and chaired it from 2007 to 2012, the company owned by thirty racecourses, which operates the Racing UK television channel and manages their interest in the Turf TV service to betting shops. Wyatt was a director of Vitec Group plc from 2002 to 2011. He was chairman of the Teaching Awards Trust from 2008 to 2013 and a trustee of the Services Sound and Vision Corporation 2008–13. In 2013 he joined the board of the Welsh National Opera.

Memoir 
In 2018 Signal Books published his memoir, Oxford Boy – A Post-War Townie Childhood, of which Miriam Margolyes wrote, "The book is a TRIUMPH, clever in presenting a lost era, showing how class & rage & cunning made people as we are."

Personal life 
Will Wyatt married Jane Bagenal in April 1966. They have two daughters, Hannah a television executive and Rozzy a theatrical agent, and one granddaughter, Honey Wyatt.

Bibliography 
 B.Traven: A Mystery Solved, Cape, 1980 (in USA published by Doubleday as The Secret of the Sierra Madre): "Thriller of the year" – Paul Theroux in Time
 Masters of the Wired World (contributor), Financial Times/Pitman, 1999
 The Fun Factory: A Life in the BBC, Aurum, 2003
 Oxford Boy: A Post-War Townie Childhood, Signal Books, 2018
Also:
 "Television Beyond the Millennium" (Proceedings of the Royal Institution, Vol. 69)
 "Facing the Public" (Royal Television Society Huw Wheldon Memorial Lecture 1996)

References

External links

Review of his autobiography from New Statesman.

1942 births
Living people
British television producers
British television executives
Commanders of the Order of the British Empire
People associated with the University of the Arts London
BBC executives
People educated at Magdalen College School, Oxford
Alumni of Emmanuel College, Cambridge